The 1931–32 season was the 59th season of competitive football in Scotland and the 42nd season of the Scottish Football League.

Scottish League Division One 

Champions: Motherwell
Relegated: Dundee United, Leith Athletic

Scottish League Division Two 

Promoted: East Stirlingshire, St. Johnstone

Scottish Cup 

Rangers were winners of the Scottish Cup after a 3–0 replay win over Kilmarnock.

Other honours

National

County 

 – aggregate over two legs

Highland League

Junior Cup 
Glasgow Perthshire were winners of the Junior Cup after a 2–1 win over Kirkintilloch Rob Roy in the final.

Scotland national team 

Key:
 (H) = Home match
 (A) = Away match
 BHC = British Home Championship

References

External links 
 Scottish Football Historical Archive